Nephoplagia is a genus of parasitic flies in the family Tachinidae.

Species
Nephoplagia arcuata Townsend, 1919

Distribution
Peru.

References

Diptera of North America
Dexiinae
Tachinidae genera
Monotypic Brachycera genera
Taxa named by Charles Henry Tyler Townsend